Cyrestis themire  is a butterfly of the family Nymphalidae. It is found in the Malay archipelago.

Subspecies
C. t. themire Thailand, Peninsular Malaya, Sumatra, Tonkin
C. t. pemanggilensis Eliot, 1978 Pulau Pemanggil
C. t. adrianus Kalis, 1933 Kangean Island
C. t. binghami Martin, 1903 Burma
C. t. deboeri Kalis, 1941 Bali
C. t. dohertyi (Moore, [1899]) Sumbawa
C. t. enganica Fruhstorfer, 1902Enggano
C. t. horsfieldi (Moore, [1899]) Java
C. t. siamensis Fruhstorfer, 1898Thailand
C. t. robinsoni Pendlebury, 1933 Pulau Tioman
C. t. vatinia Fruhstorfer, 1901 North Indo-China

References

Cyrestinae
Butterflies described in 1884